Pavel Halouska (born 23 May 1995) is a Czech football player who currently plays for Blansko.

References
 
 
 Profile at FC Zbrojovka Brno official site
 Profile at 1. SC Znojmo official site

1995 births
Living people
Czech footballers
Czech First League players
Czech National Football League players
FC Zbrojovka Brno players
SK Líšeň players
1. SC Znojmo players
1. SK Prostějov players
FK Blansko players
Footballers from Brno
Association football goalkeepers